Peter Anthony Hecomovich (June 13, 1918 – May 21, 1993) was an American multi-sport athlete in football and basketball. In basketball, he played in the National Basketball League for the Oshkosh All-Stars in one game during the 1940–41 season. In football, he was the starting quarterback for the University of Idaho and was selected as the 284th overall pick in the 1943 NFL Draft, but did not actually play in the NFL.

References

1918 births
1993 deaths
United States Army personnel of World War II
American football quarterbacks
American men's basketball players
Basketball players from Minnesota
Guards (basketball)
Idaho Vandals football players
Idaho Vandals men's basketball players
Military personnel from Minnesota
Oshkosh All-Stars players
People from Itasca County, Minnesota
Players of American football from Minnesota